Hongliutan is a village near the town of Zhenchuan, Yuyang District, Yulin prefecture in Shaanxi province, China.

Hongliutan has a school run by the Black Dragons  and is on the banks of the Wuding River. An ancient Black Dragon temple stood in the village until it was destroyed in the 1960s by followers of Mao Zedong.  It was rebuilt in 1986.  The chief of the village is Wang Kehua.

See also
 List of villages in China

References

Villages in China
Yulin, Shaanxi